Oulu City Hall is the seat for the municipal government of the City of Oulu, Finland. It is located in the Pokkinen district of the central Oulu.

The neo-renaissance style city hall was designed by a Swedish architect Johan Erik Stenberg as the restaurant and hotel Seurahuone in 1885. The third floor was added and other major changes made in 1920 according to plans of architect Oiva Kallio. Some of the changes were reversed during the renovation in 1978–1982, for example the doors were restored to their original location.

The city council has assembled in the city hall since 21 December 1920 and the municipal government since 7 January 1931. The Oulu City Theatre has also had its facilities in the city hall.

References

External links 
 

Government buildings completed in 1886
Buildings and structures in Oulu
Renaissance Revival architecture in Finland
City and town halls in Finland
Pokkinen
Defunct hotels